C&S may refer to:
Citizens & Southern National Bank
C&S Wholesale Grocers
Colorado and Southern Railway
Charleston and Savannah Railway
Chopped and screwed, a musical technique
Chivalry & Sorcery role playing game
Chase & Status a drum & bass producer duo
Culture and sensitivity